Chrysomela mainensis is a species of leaf beetle in the family Chrysomelidae. It is found in North America.

Subspecies
These three subspecies belong to the species Chrysomela mainensis:
 Chrysomela mainensis interna Brown, 1956
 Chrysomela mainensis littorea Brown, 1956
 Chrysomela mainensis mainensis J. Bechyné, 1954

References

Further reading

 
 
 

Chrysomelinae
Articles created by Qbugbot
Beetles described in 1954